He Did and He Didn't is a 1916 American short comedy film starring Roscoe "Fatty" Arbuckle and Mabel Normand.

Production

The dark plot, extremely sophisticated for its time, involves a corpulent husband who finds himself consumed by jealousy when his wife's dashingly handsome old schoolmate unexpectedly turns up for dinner. The film was also written and directed by Arbuckle.

Because it was billed as a comedy, the ending attributes the assumptions of the husband, including the murder, to eating bad lobster. After several lighthearted comedies featuring Mabel Normand and Roscoe Arbuckle, this seemed to be an added dimension to film genre in general, in that it attributed serious jealousy fantasies to human nature, but still managed to maintain a cheerful demeanor overall in its approximate 20 minutes. It may be the first "dramedy" in existence.

The film was shot when many early film studios in America's first motion picture industry were based in Fort Lee, New Jersey, at the beginning of the 20th century.

Cast
 Roscoe Arbuckle — The Doctor
 Mabel Normand — His Wife
 William Jefferson (credited as Wm. Jefferson) — Her Schoolmate
 Al St. John — A Bounding Burglar
 Joe Bordeaux — The Burglar's Accomplice (uncredited)

See also
 List of American films of 1916
 Fatty Arbuckle filmography

References

External links

Lantern slide: He Did and He Didn't

1916 films
1916 comedy films
1916 short films
Silent American comedy films
American black-and-white films
Films directed by Roscoe Arbuckle
Films produced by Mack Sennett
Keystone Studios films
Triangle Film Corporation films
American silent short films
Films shot in Fort Lee, New Jersey
Films with screenplays by Roscoe Arbuckle
Articles containing video clips
American comedy short films
1910s American films